"Overpass Graffiti" is a song by British singer-songwriter Ed Sheeran, released through Asylum and Atlantic Records on 29 October 2021, as the third single from his fifth studio album, = (2021). It was written and produced by Sheeran, Johnny McDaid and Fred.

Promotion and release
On 19 August 2021, Sheeran announced his fifth studio album, =, in which the song is listed on the tracklist. He later performed the song for NPR's Tiny Desk Concert series on 26 October 2021. On 29 October 2021, "Overpass Graffiti" was released alongside the album as the third single.

Composition
"Overpass Graffiti" is in its fast tempo which is written in the key of C major and it is composed in common time ( time).

Lyric video
A lyric video for the song was uploaded to YouTube on 29 October 2021 along with the other lyric videos of the songs that appeared on the tracklisting of =.

Music video
The music video of the song was released on 29 October 2021 on Sheeran's YouTube account the same day as its parent album's release, which was directed by Jason Koenig who previously directed the official music videos for "Shape of You", "Galway Girl", "Perfect", "South of the Border" and "Put It All on Me". In the video, Sheeran accidentally gets left behind by his tour bus and ends up going on wild adventures, meeting different people on the way, ranging from going camping with a group of teens, going wild in a glow in the dark party, riding with a bike gang, and chasing the tour bus in a car with a family. The music video features retired professional sumo wrestler Yamamotoyama Ryūta (credited as "Yama"), who appears towards the end of the clip inviting Sheeran for a ride on the bus. The video also features a cameo from Emilio Rivera. Finally, the snippet of the Japanese cover of Sheeran's smash-hit "Shape of You" by Japanese singer MARINA plays during the end credits, as the bus (now with Sheeran on it) drives away. In a blink and you’d miss it scene at the glow in the dark party, the female boxer, Pegouskie, from the ‘Shape of You’ music video (where Yamamotoyama also starred), appears in a boxing stance with Sheeran.

Critical reception
Stereogum described the song as "new wave-esque". In an album review, The New York Times said of the song, "At least the best song on the album is also the one that seems destined to be his next you'll-hear-it-till-you're-sick-of-it smash: “Overpass Graffiti”, a moody, synth-streaked '80s throwback that sounds like a more melancholy update of Rod Stewart's "Young Turks." In an article about the song, Genius described it as "an '80s synth-pop-inspired song about struggling to let go after a breakup."

Track listing
Digital download, streaming and CD single
"Overpass Graffiti" – 3:56

Digital download and streaming
"Overpass Graffiti" (Alle Farben Remix) – 3:23

Digital download and streaming
"Overpass Graffiti" (TCTS Remix) – 4:36

Credits and personnel
 Ed Sheeran – vocals, backing vocals, acoustic guitar, songwriting, production, writing
 Johnny McDaid – backing vocals, bass, electric guitar, keyboards, programming, production, engineering, songwriting
 Fred – bass, drums, keyboards, programming, backing vocals, acoustic guitar, production, engineering, songwriting
 Louise Clare Marshall – additional vocals
 Stuart Hawkes – mastering
 Mark "Spike" Stent – mixing
 Graham Archer – engineering, vocal production
 Kieran Beardmore – mixing assistance
 Charlie Holmes – mixing assistance
 Will Reynolds – engineering assistance
 Hal Ritson – additional engineering

Charts

Weekly charts

Year-end charts

Certifications

Release history

References

External links
 
 
 

2021 singles
2021 songs
Ed Sheeran songs
Song recordings produced by Ed Sheeran
Song recordings produced by Fred Again
Songs written by Ed Sheeran
Songs written by Fred Again
Songs written by Johnny McDaid
Asylum Records singles
Atlantic Records singles